Hassane Kolingar (born 6 March 1998) is a French rugby union player. His position is loosehead prop and he currently plays for Racing 92 in the Top 14.

He was called for the first time in the France national rugby team in November 2020 for the Autumn Nations Cup.

Honours

International 
 France (U20)
World Rugby Under 20 Championship winners: 2018

References

External links
Racing 92 profile

1998 births
Living people
Rugby union players from Paris
French rugby union players
France international rugby union players
Racing 92 players
Rugby union props